An annular solar eclipse occurred on October 19, 1865. A solar eclipse occurs when the Moon passes between Earth and the Sun, thereby totally or partly obscuring the image of the Sun for a viewer on Earth. An annular solar eclipse occurs when the Moon's apparent diameter is smaller than the Sun's, blocking most of the Sun's light and causing the Sun to look like an annulus (ring). An annular eclipse appears as a partial eclipse over a region of the Earth thousands of kilometres wide.

Description
The greatest eclipse was at 16:21:14 UTC (12:21 local time) at 21.3°N 60.2°W northeast of Antigua and Barbuda and lasted 9 min 27 sec.  The maximum width of band was 326 km (203 mi).

The eclipse was visible in North America (except for the Yukon, Alaska and the northernmost part of Greenland), Central America, the Caribbean South America including, the northern parts of Peru and Bolivia and most of Brazil, the westernmost parts of Africa and Europe (westernmost Spain and Portugal, Ireland and parts of Scotland).  Areas that were in the edge of the eclipse included the Galapagos Islands.  In North America, it occurred in the morning, in South America, midday and in Africa and Europe, near the evening hours.

Areas that were inside the umbral portion included the United States such as parts of the north of the state Oregon, Washington Territory (now state), close to the 49th parallel and distant from the Pacific, Idaho, the Cheyenne and the Lakota areas, Nebraska Territory (now state), the states of Kansas, Missouri, southern Illinois, southern Indiana, western Kentucky, much of Tennessee, the northeast corner of Alabama, parts of the north of Georgia, the west of North Carolina and nearly all of South Carolina.  Off the coast of Africa, it included the Cape Verdean Islands of Sotavento and Boa Vista Island, at the time a Portuguese colony.  In Africa, it included most of Senegal, at the time a French colony, southern Agawedj (or Agaouedj, now Mauritania) and parts of Mali.

Other
In many parts of Brazil except for the south, it was the third consecutive solar eclipse that took place, all of it appeared as partial, the last two were on October 30, 1864 and April 25, 1865, both with an umbral portion in one part.

See also 
 List of solar eclipses in the 19th century
 List of solar eclipses visible from the United States
 List of solar eclipses visible from the Atlantic Ocean
 List of solar eclipses visible from Brazil

References

External links 
 Google interactive maps
 Solar eclipse data

1865 10 19
Solar eclipse of 10 19
1865 10 19
October 1865 events